The 2008 FIBA Europe Under-16 Championship Division B was an international basketball competition held in Bosnia and Herzegovina in 2008.

Medalists
1.   Germany

2.   Montenegro 

3.   Bulgaria

Final ranking (comparative)
1.  Germany

2.  Slovenia

3.  Montenegro

4.  Bosnia and Herzegovina

5.  Bulgaria

6.  Sweden

7.  Switzerland

8.  Belgium

9.  Estonia

10.  Belarus

11.  Finland

12.  England

13.  Austria

14.  Iceland

15.  Macedonia

16.  Netherlands

17.  Slovakia

18.  Denmark 

19.  Romania

20.  Portugal

21.  Cyprus

22.  Luxembourg

23.  Ireland

External links
FIBA Archive

FIBA U16 European Championship Division B
2008–09 in European basketball
2008–09 in Bosnia and Herzegovina basketball
International youth basketball competitions hosted by Bosnia and Herzegovina